Lumisterol is a compound that is part of the vitamin D family of steroid compounds. It is the (9β,10α) stereoisomer of ergosterol and was produced as a photochemical by-product in the preparation of vitamin D1, which was a mixture of vitamin D2 and lumisterol. Vitamin D2 can be formed from lumisterol by an electrocyclic ring opening and subsequent sigmatropic [1,7] hydride shift.
 
Lumisterol has an analog based on 7-dehydrocholesterol, known as lumisterol 3.

References

Vitamin D
Sterols